Kathleen Patricia McDonald O'Malley (born November 17, 1956) is a former United States circuit judge of the United States Court of Appeals for the Federal Circuit.

Early life and education 

Born in Drexel Hill, Pennsylvania, O'Malley received a double Artium Baccalaureus degree from Kenyon College in Gambier, Ohio, in 1979, graduating magna cum laude and Phi Beta Kappa. She had majors in honors history and economics, and she graduated in both with distinction. She received a Juris Doctor from Case Western Reserve University School of Law, Order of the Coif, in 1982, where she served on Law Review and was a member of the National Mock Trial Team.

Legal career 

She was a law clerk to Nathaniel R. Jones of the United States Court of Appeals for the Sixth Circuit from 1982 to 1983. She was in private practice in Columbus, Ohio, from 1983 to 1991, first at Jones, Day, Reavis and Pogue, until 1985, and then with Porter, Wright, Morris & Arthur, where she became a partner, and had a practice with an emphasis on complex corporate and commercial litigations, including intellectual property, securities fraud, trade secrets, shareholder's rights and large-scale coverage disputes. She was chief counsel to the Ohio Attorney General's Office from 1991 to 1993, where she was responsible, under the direction of the Attorney General, for the overall functioning and management of all divisions of the Attorney General's Office, including litigation, law enforcement, legislative activities, policy initiatives and the human resources and administrative aspects of the office. From 1993 to 1994, she was Chief of Staff and First Assistant  to the Attorney General, overseeing the work of the office's 350 attorneys and acting as Counsel of Record in the state's more sensitive and complex legal battles.

Federal judicial service

Service on district court 

On September 20, 1994, O'Malley was nominated by President Bill Clinton to a seat on the United States District Court for the Northern District of Ohio vacated by John William Potter. She was confirmed by the United States Senate on October 7, 1994, and received her commission on October 12, 1994. Her service was terminated upon her elevation to the Federal Circuit.

Service on court of appeals 

On March 10, 2010, President Barack Obama nominated O'Malley for elevation to a seat on the United States Court of Appeals for the Federal Circuit. She was confirmed by the United States Senate on December 22, 2010. She received her commission on December 27, 2010. In July 2021, it was announced that O'Malley would retire on March 11, 2022.

Notable cases

Oracle v. Google

On May 9, 2014, the Court of Appeals for the Federal Circuit decided the case of Oracle v. Google (authored by Judge O'Malley).  The case raised the question of whether the Java API was eligible for copyright protection.  The Federal Circuit reversed a lower court finding for Google by concluding that the API was eligible for protection.  The Supreme Court denied review of the case at the recommendation of the Solicitor General. Judge O'Malley wrote the second decision in the second appeal in the case overturning the trial court by holding that as a matter of law Google's use of the Java APIs in its Android Operating System was not fair use.

References

Sources

1956 births
Living people
20th-century American judges
20th-century American women judges
21st-century American judges
21st-century American women judges
Case Western Reserve University School of Law alumni
Jones Day people
Judges of the United States Court of Appeals for the Federal Circuit
Judges of the United States District Court for the Northern District of Ohio
Kenyon College alumni
People from Drexel Hill, Pennsylvania
United States court of appeals judges appointed by Barack Obama
United States district court judges appointed by Bill Clinton